San Nicolás de Bari and San Pedro Mártir is a Valencian Gothic style, Roman Catholic parish church located in Valencia (Spain).

History
The church was founded in the 13th century, with a layout that includes a single-nave with six chapels between the buttresses and polygonal apse. The church was refurbished in Gothic in the 15th century, and includes a rose window alluding to a miracle of Saint Nicholas. There is an outdoor Chapel closed with a gate which is called the fossar, because there was before the parish cemetery. The other gate, which overlooks the square of San Nicolás, however, is a neo-gothic 19th-century recreation.

The interior of the church was completed between 1690-1693, and was decorated by Juan Pérez Castiel in baroque fashion. It has frescoes, depicting the lives of San Nicola and Peter of Verona, along with virtues and allegories, designed by Antonio Palomino and completed by Dionis Vidal. The chapel altarpieces include works by Juan de Juanes, Fernando Yáñez de la Almedina, Jerónimo Jacinto de Espinosa, and José Vergara Gimeno.

In the Church of San Nicolás, of which Pope Callixtus III was rector before becoming Pope, in the door that overlooks to the square of San Nicolás, he is remembered with a plaque regarding the prediction of Saint Vincent Ferrer that Alfonso de Borja would become Pope and then would canonize him.

See also

Route of the Borgias

External links

Valencian Heritage Library 
Information and photos about the church 
Information of the Valencia Town Hall 

13th-century Roman Catholic church buildings in Spain
Gothic architecture in the Valencian Community
Baroque architecture in the Valencian Community
Bien de Interés Cultural landmarks in the Province of Valencia
Roman Catholic churches in Valencia
Route of the Borgias